Chennamkary is a village in Kuttanad Taluk in Alappuzha District of Kerala state, India.

Geography 
Chennamkary is located 12 km east of the district headquarters Alappuzha, 4 km from Champakkulam, 141 km from the state capital Thiruvananthapuram, and is surrounded by Veliyanad Taluk towards the east, Ambalappuzha Taluk and Alappuzha Taluk towards the west, and Aryad Taluk towards the north. 

Alappuzha, Changanassery , Thiruvalla , Kottayam are nearby cities.

Economy 

The major income is still from agriculture and fishing despite tourism. Chennamkary is also a major spot of movie/TV soap/music video shootings due to its beautiful landscape view. Saint Kuriakose Elias Chavara, one of the founding fathers and the first superior general of C.M.I., was baptized at St. Joseph's Syro-Malabar Catholic Church, Chennamkary Which is also The first Catholic Church in Asia dedicated to Saint Joseph.

Places around Chennamkary 
Thottuvatala
Pallathuruthy
Thomayiram
Pazhupadam
Irumpanam
Somathuram
Arunootampadam
Kuppappuram
Kuttamangalam
Kainakary
Chathurthiakary

Places in Alappuzha district